Amelia A Curtis (born 28 August 1972) is a British actress who was born in Stockholm, Sweden. She is notable for having played the role of Viki Lovejoy in the final series of Lovejoy, a role that she took over from Amelia Shankley.

Filmography
Family Style (Short) (1993)
The Bill (1994, 1996, 2010) 
Lovejoy (1994)
EastEnders (1995)
Cadfael: The Virgin in the Ice (1995)
Pie in the Sky (1996)
London Bridge (1996)
Staying Alive (1997)
The Nine Lives of Tomas Katz (1999)
Janice Beard (1999)
Kevin & Perry Go Large (2000)
Understanding Jane (2001)
South West 9 (2001)
At Home with the Braithwaites (2002)
FeardotCom (2002)
Casualty (2003, 2022) 
P.O.W. (2003)
Empire (2005)
New Tricks (2005)The Royal (2006–2007)Love Soup (2008)Holby City (2008, 2012)Waterloo Road (2012)The Syndicate (2013)Emmerdale (2014, 2016, 2021)Doctors (2015, 2018)Love, Lies & Records (2017)Coronation Street'' (2017, 2020)

External links

1972 births
British actresses
Living people
Actresses from Stockholm
People educated at Hurtwood House
British people of Swedish descent